Bunker Hill is an unincorporated community in Howard County, in the U.S. state of Missouri.

History
The community was named in commemoration of the Battle of Bunker Hill. The post office at Bunker Hill was called Myers, after Henry Myers, a pioneer citizen. The Myers post office was established in 1859, and remained in operation until 1905.

References

Unincorporated communities in Howard County, Missouri
Unincorporated communities in Missouri